Taizu of Liang may refer to:

 Zhang Gui (255–314), Governor of Liang during the Jin dynasty, sometimes known as Taizu of Former Liang
 Lü Guang (337–400) of Later Liang during the Sixteen Kingdoms
 Li Gao (351–417) of Western Liang during the Sixteen Kingdoms
 Juqu Mengxun (368–433) of Northern Liang during the Sixteen Kingdoms
 Xiao Shunzhi ( 477–482), whose son Emperor Wu of Liang posthumously honored him as Emperor Taizu of Liang
 Zhu Wen (852–912) of Later Liang during the Five Dynasties and Ten Kingdoms period

See also
 Taizu (disambiguation)
 Liang (disambiguation)